The men's pole vault event at the 2023 European Athletics Indoor Championships will be held on 4 March at 09:04 (qualification) and on 5 March at 19:18 local time.

Medalists

Records

Results

Qualification
Qualification: Qualifying performance 5.75 (Q) or at least 8 best performers (q) advance to the Final.

Final

References

2023 European Athletics Indoor Championships
Pole vault at the European Athletics Indoor Championships